Pocket Penguins is a series of books released by Penguin Classics in 2016. The series echoes the style of the original Penguin Books, with smaller A-format size, and tri-band design. The first 20 books were released in May 2016, and described by publishing director Simon Winder as "a mix of the famous and the unjustly overlooked". A Pocket Penguins series of 70 titles was published to celebrate Penguin's 70th birthday in 2005. It is known as the Pocket Penguins 70s and is available as a boxed set. A similar set of pocket Penguin 60s - this time only 60 books, each with 60 pages - was published to mark the company’s 60th birthday in 1995.

The Books 

Pocket Penguins series of 2005 
A Pocket Penguins series of 70 titles was published to celebrate Penguin's 70th birthday in 2005. Each has 64 pages. They were designed to be collectable with each cover created as part of a project undertaken by 70 leading artists and designers. Among the authors in the Pocket Penguin series are: Eric Schlosser, Nick Hornby, Albert Camus, P.D. James, Richard Dawkins, India Knight, Marian Keyes, Jorge Luis Borges, Roald Dahl, Jonathan Safran Foer, Homer, Paul Theroux, Elizabeth David, Anais Nin, Antony Beevor, Gustave Flaubert, Anne Frank, James Kelman, Hari Kunzru, Simon Schama, William Trevor, George Orwell, Michael Moore, Helen Dunmore, J.K. Galbraith, Gervase Phinn, W.G. Sebald, Redmond O'Hanlon, Ali Smith, Sigmund Freud, Simon Armitage, Hunter S. Thompson, Vladimir Nabokov, Niall Ferguson, Muriel Spark, Steven Pinker, Tony Harrison, John Updike, Will Self, H.G. Wells, Noam Chomsky, Jamie Oliver, Virginia Woolf, Zadie Smith, John Mortimer, F. Scott Fitzgerald, Roger McGough, Ian Kershaw, Gabriel Garcia Marquez, Steven Runciman, Sue Townsend, Primo Levi, Alistair Cooke, William Boyd, Robert Graves, Melissa Bank, Truman Capote, David Lodge, Anton Chekhov, Claire Tomalin, David Cannadine, P.G. Wodehouse, Franz Kafka, Dave Eggers, Evelyn Waugh, Pat Barker, Jonathan Coe, John Steinbeck and Alain de Botton.

See also 
Penguin Essentials
Penguin Red Classics

References

External links 
 Official site

Lists of novels
Penguin Books book series